Jesper Bärgård (born April 28, 1993) is a Swedish ice hockey player. He is currently playing for Vimmerby HC of the Hockeyettan.

Bärgård played two games in the Elitserien with Linköpings HC during the 2012–13 Elitserien season.

References

External links

1993 births
HC Vita Hästen players
Linköping HC players
Living people
Nybro Vikings players
Olofströms IK players
People from Enköping
Swedish ice hockey right wingers
Sportspeople from Uppsala County